Colette was a French high fashion, streetwear, and accessory retailer. The three floor  concept store was located in Paris and contained an exhibition space, bookshop, and a "water bar" serving more than 100 brands of bottled water. It closed permanently in  December 2017. Colette's logo was two blue dots.

History
The boutique was founded in 1997 by Colette Roussaux; her daughter, Sarah Andelman, took an active role as creative director and purchasing manager in the store's final years. Esquire called the store "like Kith, Bergdorf Goodman, and Opening Ceremony all rolled into one."
The store  did €32 million in sales revenue in 2016, with e-commerce accounting for 25% of revenue. In December 2005, Forbes described Colette as“the trendiest store in the world”.

Brands

The shop was known for stocking the first collections of fashion brands and designers that became famous later such as Jeremy Scott, Raf Simons, Proenza Schouler, Rodarte, Mary Katrantzou, Sacai, Simone Rocha, Christopher Kane and Olympia Le Tan. Rihanna and Pharrell Williams, among others, have been hosted by Colette in pop-up shops.

Reputation
Karl Lagerfeld said of Colette: "It’s the only shop where I go because they have things no one else has. I buy watches, telephones, jewellery there - everything really. They have invented a formula that you can’t copy easily, because there is only one Colette and her and Sarah are 200 percent involved."

Closure
In July 2017, it announced its impending closure in December 2017. Osman Ahmed of Business of Fashion called it "the end of an era".
Sarah Andelman said they chose to close the business rather than sell it because "it was like a baby for us" and  "if someone else ran it, it would not be the same."

Today (summer 2022) there is a boutique of "Saint Laurent - Rive Droite".

See also
10 Corso Como
Dover Street Market
Bergdorf Goodman
Barneys New York
Rene Russo (1954–present)
Rachel Ticotin (1958–present)

References

External links 
 Official website

Shops in Paris
Clothing retailers of France
Buildings and structures in the 1st arrondissement of Paris
Luxury brands
Retail companies established in 1997
Retail companies disestablished in 2017
Clothing companies established in 1997
Clothing companies disestablished in 2017